Lyall Islands is a group of four islands, Unger, Surgeon, Novosad and Hughes, lying just outside the entrance to Yule Bay, Victoria Land. Discovered by Capt. James Clark Ross, 1841, who named the group for David Lyall (1817–1895), MD, RN, FLS, Asst. Surgeon on the Terror. In keeping with this, US-ACAN has named some of the individual islands and nearby features for surgeons who have worked in Antarctica.

References 

Islands of Victoria Land
Archipelagoes of the Southern Ocean
Pennell Coast